Tychy railway station is a railway station in Tychy, Poland. As of 2012, it is served by PKP Intercity (Ekspres and TLK services), Przewozy Regionalne (local and InterRegio services) and Koleje Śląskie. The station was opened in 1868

Train services
The station is served by the following service(s):

Express Intercity Premium services (EIP) Warsaw - Katowice - Bielsko-Biała
Express Intercity Premium services (EIP) Gdynia - Warsaw - Katowice - Gliwice/Bielsko-Biała
Intercity services (IC) Warszawa - Częstochowa - Katowice - Bielsko-Biała
Intercity services (IC) Białystok - Warszawa - Częstochowa - Katowice - Bielsko-Biała
Intercity services (IC) Olsztyn - Warszawa - Skierniewice - Częstochowa - Katowice - Bielsko-Biała
Regional services (KŚ)  Tychy Lodowisko - Katowice
Regional services (KŚ)  Tychy Lodowisko - Katowice - Sosnowiec Główny - Dąbrowa Górnicza Ząbkowice - Zawiercie
Regional Service (KŚ)  Katowice - Pszczyna - Czechowice-Dziedzice - Bielsko-Biała Gł. - Żywiec - Zwardoń
Regional services (KŚ)  Katowice - Pszczyna - Bielsko-Biała Gł - Żywiec - Nowy Targ - Zakopane
Regional Service (KŚ)  Katowice - Pszczyna - Skoczów - Ustroń - Wisła Głębce

External links
Tychy railway station at kolej.one.pl

References

Railway stations in Poland opened in 1868
Railway stations in Silesian Voivodeship
Railway stations served by Koleje Śląskie
Railway stations served by Przewozy Regionalne InterRegio
Railway station